Misleading Track (Traditional Chinese: 奪命真夫 or also known as 叠影危情) is a TVB modern drama series released overseas in February 2005 and broadcast on TVB Jade Channel in June 2005.

Cast

Viewership ratings

References

External links
TVB.com Misleading Track - Official Website 
Butterfly's Place.net Misleading Track - Episodic Synopsis 

TVB dramas
2005 Hong Kong television series debuts
2005 Hong Kong television series endings